Saskia is a Germanic feminine given name. There are at least two different sources of the name. One is of North German and Northeast Netherlands origin, where it originally meant "a Saxon woman" (metathesis of "Saxia").

Notable people with the name include:
 Saskia Alusalu (born 1994), Estonian speed skater
 Saskia Bartusiak (born 1982), German football player
 Saskia Burmeister (born 1985), Australian actress
 Saskia Clark (born 1979), British sailor
 Saskia Howard Clarke, contestant on the Big Brother British television series in 2005
 Saskia Cohen-Tanugi (1959–2020), French actress and theatre director
 Saskia de Brauw (born 1981), Dutch artist and model
 Saskia de Coster (born 1976), Belgian writer
 Saskia de Jonge (born 1986), Dutch swimmer
 Saskia D’Onofrio (1924-1999), Finnish opera singer and actress, better known by her stage name Maaria Eira
 Saskia Elemans (born 1977), Dutch cyclist
 Saskia Esken (born 1961), German politician 
 Saskia Estupinan, Ecuadorian doctor
 Saskia Fischer (born 1966), German actress
 Saskia Garel (born 1977), Jamaican-Canadian actress
 Saskia Giorgini (born 1985), Dutch-Italian pianist
 Saskia Hamilton (born 1967), American poet
 Saskia Hampele (active since 1997), Australian actress
 Saskia Hippe (born 1991), German volleyball player
 Saskia Hölbling (born 1971), Austrian choreographer and dancer
 Saskia Holleman (1945–2013), Dutch actress, lawyer and model
 Saskia Holmkvist (born 1971), Swedish artist
 Saskia Kosterink (born 1984), Dutch softball player
 Saskia Laroo (born 1959), Dutch jazz musician
 Saskia Linssen (born 1970), Dutch model and actress
 Saskia Mulder (born 1973), Dutch actress and younger sister of Karen Mulder
 Saskia Noort (born 1967), Dutch author
 Saskia Olde Wolbers (born 1971), Dutch video artist
 Saskia Ozinga (born 1960), Dutch activist
 Saskia Ozols (active since 2006), American artist
 Saskia Rao-de Haas (born 1971), Dutch cellist based in Delhi, India
 Saskia Reeves (born 1961), British actress
 Saskia Rosendahl (born 1993), German actress
 Saskia Sassen (born 1947), Dutch-American sociologist
 Saskia Loretta van Erven Garcia (born 1987), Dutch-Colombian fencer
 Saskia van Hintum (born 1970), Dutch volleyball player
 Saskia van Rijswijk (born 1960), Dutch martial artist and actress
 Saskia van Uylenburgh (1612-1642), wife of Dutch painter Rembrandt van Rijn
 Saskia Vester (born 1959), German actress 
 Saskia Wickham (born 1967), British actress
 Saskia Wummelsdorf (born 1980), German badminton player

Fictional characters 
 Saskia Duncan, a character in the British soap opera EastEnders
 Saskia the Dragonslayer, a character from the 2011 Polish video game The Witcher 2: Assassins of Kings
 Saskia Duncan, a character in the 2012–2013 Australian TV drama Dance Academy
 Saskia Kupferberg, daughter of Dr. Elliot Kupferberg on The Sopranos
 Saskia the Unyielding, a Magic: The Gathering card
 Saskia Madding, a character in Charles de Lint's Newford series
 Frederika Mathilde Louisa Saskia, the Queen of the Netherlands, character in Neal Stephenson's "Termination Shock."

See also
 461 Saskia, an asteroid
 Noah and Saskia, a 2004 Australian children's television program
 Saskia & Serge (active since 1967), a Dutch vocal duo

Dutch feminine given names